Minnow Branch is a stream in Benton and Morgan Counties in the U.S. state of Missouri. It is a tributary of Big Buffalo Creek.

Minnow Branch was named for the fact the creek supplied minnows as bait.

See also
List of rivers of Missouri

References

Rivers of Benton County, Missouri
Rivers of Morgan County, Missouri
Rivers of Missouri